Lugdunum, formerly known as the Gallo-Roman Museum of Lyon-Fourvière, is a museum of Gallo-Roman civilisation in Lyon (Roman Lugdunum). Previously presented at the Museum of Fine Arts of Lyon and the Antiquarium, the municipal Gallo-Roman collection was transferred to a new building designed by Bernard Zehrfuss and opened in 1975 near the city's Roman theatre and odeon, on a hill known as Fourvière, located in the heart of the Roman city. Internally, it is formed of a concrete spiral ramp descending and branching out into the display rooms. It is managed and operated by the Metropolis of Lyon jointly with the archaeological museum of Saint-Romain-en-Gal. As well as displaying its own permanent collections of Roman, Celtic and pre-Roman material (inscriptions, statues, jewellery, everyday objects), a plan-relief of the ancient town and scale models of its major monuments such as the theatre and the Odeon, it also regularly hosts temporary exhibitions.

Circus Mosaic

Discovered in the Ainay district in 1806, this mosaic shows a circus during a chariot race, making it one of the few ancient representations of such a race (Lyon itself had a circus, the place of which has not been discovered).

Other Objects
 the Gallic Coligny calendar
 fragments of the decoration of the Altar of Rome and Augustus, from the federal sanctuary of the three Gauls
 the Lyon Tablet, a speech by Claudius
 large mosaics such as La mosaïque de Bacchus and the Mosaïque aux Svastikas (Swastikas Mosaic).
 the Taurobolic Altar, dedicated in 160 to restore the health of Antoninus Pius
 many large Dionysiac sarcophagi, including the Sarcophagus of the Triumph of Bacchus
 the Lyon-Vaise Hoard of dishes, jewellery and silver statuettes buried during a 3rd-century Germanic invasion

External links 

 Official website (in English)

Museums of ancient Rome in France
Museums in Lyon
Roman Lyon
5th arrondissement of Lyon
Buildings and structures completed in 1975
Museums established in 1975
1975 establishments in France
Modernist architecture in France
Gallo-Roman culture